The China Basin fire was a five-alarm fire  that occurred shortly before 5:00 p.m. on March 11, 2014, in the Mission Bay neighborhood of San Francisco, California. The conflagration appeared to completely destroy Block 5, a 172-unit building, part of Mega Blocks 360, a  apartment complex being developed by San Francisco-based BRE Properties Inc. at China Basin and Fourth Street.

By the end of the day, the 150 firefighters dispatched to the event managed to mostly contain the fire. One firefighter sustained second-degree burns to the face and hands, and a fire chief sprained an ankle, but no other casualties were reported.

References

External links 

 Time-lapse video

Fires in California
2014 fires in the United States
2014 in San Francisco
Building and structure fires in the United States
March 2014 events in the United States
Residential building fires